In quantum mechanics, notably in quantum information theory, fidelity is a measure of the "closeness" of two quantum states. It expresses the probability that one state will pass a test to identify as the other. The fidelity is not a metric on the space of density matrices, but it can be used to define the Bures metric on this space.

While not obvious from the general definition, the fidelity is symmetric: .

Motivation 

.

The fidelity deals with the marginal distribution of the random variables. It says nothing about the joint distribution of those variables. Notice that  if and only if . In general, . The measure  is known as the Bhattacharyya coefficient.

Given a classical measure of the distinguishability of two probability distributions, one can motivate a measure of distinguishability of two quantum states as follows. Naturally, the experimenter will choose the best POVM they can find, so this motivates defining the quantum fidelity as the squared Bhattacharyya coefficient when extremized over all possible POVMs :

It was shown by Fuchs and Caves that this manifestly symmetric definition is equivalent to the simple asymmetric formula given in the next section.

Definition 

Given two density matrices ρ and σ, the fidelity is defined by

where, for a positive semidefinite matrix ,   denotes its unique positive square root, as given by the spectral theorem. The Euclidean inner product from the classical definition is replaced by the Hilbert–Schmidt inner product.

Some of the important properties of the quantum state fidelity are:

 Symmetry. .
 Bounded values.
 Consistency with fidelity between probability distributions. To see this, remember that if  then they can be diagonalized in the same basis: so that 
 Simplified expressions for pure states. If  is pure, then . This follows immediately from the above expression for  pure.

 Equivalent expression.
An equivalent expression for the fidelity may be written, using the trace norm

 Explicit expression for qubits.

If  (or ) is pure, this result is simplified further to  since  for pure states.

Alternative definition 
Some authors use an alternative definition  and call this quantity fidelity. The definition of  however is more common. To avoid confusion,  could be called "square root fidelity". In any case it is advisable to clarify the adopted definition whenever the fidelity is employed.

Other properties

Unitary invariance 

Direct calculation shows that the fidelity is preserved by unitary evolution, i.e.

for any unitary operator .

Uhlmann's theorem 

We saw that for two pure states, their fidelity coincides with the overlap. Uhlmann's theorem generalizes this statement to mixed states, in terms of their purifications:

Theorem Let ρ and σ be density matrices acting on Cn. Let ρ be the unique positive square root of ρ and

be a purification of ρ (therefore  is an orthonormal basis), then the following equality holds:

where  is a purification of σ. Therefore, in general, the fidelity is the maximum overlap between purifications.

Sketch of proof
A simple proof can be sketched as follows. Let  denote the vector

and σ be the unique positive square root of σ. We see that, due to the unitary freedom in square root factorizations and choosing orthonormal bases, an arbitrary purification of σ is of the form

where Vi's are unitary operators. Now we directly calculate

But in general, for any square matrix A and unitary U, it is true that |tr(AU)| ≤ tr((A*A)). Furthermore, equality is achieved if U* is the unitary operator in the polar decomposition of A. From this follows directly Uhlmann's theorem.

Proof with explicit decompositions 
We will here provide an alternative, explicit way to prove Uhlmann's theorem.

To start, let us show that .

The overlap between the purifications iswhere the unitary matrix  is defined asThe conclusion is now reached via using the inequality : Note that this inequality is the triangle inequality applied to the singular values of the matrix. The inequality is saturated and becomes an equality when , that is, when  and thus . Because this choice is possible regardless of the states, we can finally conclude that

Consequences 
Some immediate consequences of Uhlmann's theorem are
 Fidelity is symmetric in its arguments, i.e. F (ρ,σ) = F (σ,ρ). Note that this is not obvious from the original definition.
 F (ρ,σ) lies in [0,1], by the Cauchy–Schwarz inequality.
 F (ρ,σ) = 1 if and only if ρ = σ, since Ψρ = Ψσ implies ρ = σ.

So we can see that fidelity behaves almost like a metric. This can be formalized and made useful by defining

It follows from the above properties that  is non-negative, symmetric in its inputs, and is equal to zero if and only if . Furthermore, it can be proved that it obeys the triangle inequality, so this angle is a metric on the state space: the Fubini–Study metric.

Relationship with the fidelity between the corresponding probability distributions 
Let  be an arbitrary positive operator-valued measure (POVM); that is, a set of operators  satisfying .

This shows that the square root of the fidelity between two quantum states is upper bounded by the Bhattacharyya coefficient between the corresponding probability distributions in any possible POVM. Indeed, it is more generally true that  where , and the minimum is taken over all possible POVMs.

Proof of inequality 
As was previously shown, the square root of the fidelity can be written as which is equivalent to the existence of a unitary operator  such that

Behavior under quantum operations 
The fidelity between two states can be shown to never decrease when a non-selective quantum operation  is applied to the states: for any trace-preserving completely positive map .

Relationship to trace distance 
We can define the trace distance between two matrices A and B in terms of the trace norm by

When A and B are both density operators, this is a quantum generalization of the statistical distance.  This is relevant because the trace distance provides upper and lower bounds on the fidelity as quantified by the Fuchs–van de Graaf inequalities,

Often the trace distance is easier to calculate or bound than the fidelity, so these relationships are quite useful.  In the case that at least one of the states is a pure state Ψ, the lower bound can be tightened.

References 

 Quantiki: Fidelity

Quantum information science